Jean-Marc Joguet (born 29 March 1965) from Beaufort, Savoie is a French ski mountaineer and long-distance runner.

Selected results

Pierra Menta (ski mountaineering)  

 1986: 1st, together with Pascal Fagnola
 1987: 2nd, together with Thierry Bochet
 1988, 5th, together with Pierre Viard Gaudin
 1995, 10th, together with René Gachet
 1996, 10th, together with René Gachet

Running 
 2006, 2nd, Tour du Beaufortain

References

External links
 Photo: Alpage des Chappes, 2009

French male long-distance runners
French male ski mountaineers
Living people
1965 births
Sportspeople from Savoie
20th-century French people